Cape Crozier is the most easterly point of Ross Island in Antarctica. It was discovered in 1841 during James Clark Ross's expedition of 1839 to 1843 with HMS Erebus and HMS Terror, and was named after Francis Crozier, captain of HMS Terror.

History

First landing, 1902
The first landing at Cape Crozier was on 22 January 1902, during Captain Scott's Discovery Expedition.  A party from RRS Discovery landed by small boat on a stony beach area a little to the west of the Cape. Scott, Edward Wilson and Charles Royds climbed the slope to a vantage point from which they could view the Barrier surface, and they were also able to observe the large Adelie penguin colony which inhabited the surrounding ice-free terrain.

Historic site
A message box was erected that day, prominently marked, for messages to be collected by any future relief ship. At the time it held a metal message cylinder, which has since been removed. The site has been designated a Historic Site or Monument (HSM 69), following a proposal by New Zealand, Norway and the United Kingdom to the Antarctic Treaty Consultative Meeting.

Terra Nova Expedition, 1910–13
Captain Scott seriously considered Cape Crozier as the base for his second Antarctic expedition. On the previous trip, the Discovery had been frozen into its McMurdo Sound berth for nearly two years, and had barely escaped in February 1904, a circumstance that had led to an expensive relief operation and some opprobrium for Scott. There would be no chance of the Terra Nova being icebound in the open seas off Cape Crozier, but the unsheltered location would make landings of stores and personnel difficult, the shore base would be at the mercy of rough weather, and the land route to the Barrier surface was problematic. Scott decided to return to McMurdo Sound for his base, though to a more northerly anchorage (Cape Evans).

Winter journey, 1911
Wilson was keen to continue researching the emperor penguin embryo, and needed to obtain eggs at an early stage of incubation, which meant collecting them in the depth of the Antarctic winter.  In the Zoology section of the Discovery Expedition's published Scientific Report he suggested a plan for a "winter journey" whereby these eggs could be retrieved. This journey, with Captain Scott's approval, was undertaken between 27 June and 2 August 1911, by Wilson, Apsley Cherry-Garrard and Henry Robertson Bowers. Cherry-Garrard later described the trek in his book, The Worst Journey in the World. In the winter darkness and extreme weather conditions the journey proved slow and hazardous, but despite mishaps three eggs were retrieved and later presented by Cherry-Garrard to the Natural History Museum. Ultimately, however, their scientific value proved minimal. The remains of a stone hut, constructed in July 1911 by Wilson's winter journey party, have been designated a Historic Site or Monument (HSM 21), following a proposal by New Zealand to the Antarctic Treaty Consultative Meeting.

Restricted site

Cape Crozier is within a restricted area and permission is required to visit it. Cape Crozier is home to one of the largest Adélie penguin colonies in the world (~270,000 breeding pairs as of 2012), one of the two southernmost emperor penguin colonies (>1900 breeding pairs as of 2018), and one of the largest south polar skua colonies in the world (~1,000 breeding pairs). It also hosts several species of lichens, including at least three not previously found in this part of Antarctica. It has been designated an Antarctic Specially Protected Area (ASPA 124), and designated an Important Bird Area (IBA) by BirdLife International. From 2001 to 2005, two enormous icebergs known as Iceberg B-15 and C16 were present near shore and affected the Adelie and Emperor penguin colonies.

Named features 
Several features on or near Cape Crozier have been charted and named by various survey and exploration groups.

Both were mapped and named by the New Zealand Geological Survey Antarctic Expedition, 1958–59. Bomb Peak was named for the bomb-like (pyroclastic) geological formations surrounding the summit of this peak. Igloo Spur was named for the stone igloo built by Dr. E. A. Wilson and his party there during the British Antarctic Expedition, 1910–13.

References

Bibliography
 Edward Wilson: Diary of the Discovery Expedition, Blandford Press 1966
 Scott's Last Expedition Vol 1, Smith, Elder & Co 1913
 Apsley Cherry-Garrard: The Worst Journey in the World, Penguin Travel Library edition 1983
 George Seaver: Edward Wilson of the Antarctic, John Murray 1940 edition

External links
 Scar.org
 Skimountaineer.com
 Nhm.ac.uy
 

Crozier, Cape
Antarctic Specially Protected Areas
Important Bird Areas of Antarctica
Seabird colonies
Historic Sites and Monuments of Antarctica
Geography of the Ross Dependency
Penguin colonies